Grupo Dramático e Sportivo Cascais is a Portuguese rugby union team. It had a player, Paulo Murinello, at the Portuguese squad that participated at the 2007 Rugby World Cup finals.
It also has a team that plays in Liga Portuguesa de Futsal.

Honors
Campeonato Nacional Honra/Super Bock:
Winner (6): 1987, 1992, 1993, 1994, 1995, 1996
Taça de Portugal de Rugby:
Winner (4): 1987, 1991, 1992, 1993
Taça Ibérica:
Winner (3): 1993, 1997

External links
Official Website 
Rugby Website 

Portuguese rugby union teams
Sport in Cascais